Dżigan, Dzigan, Dzygan,  etc. is a Jewish surname. Notable people with the surname include:

Yefim Dzigan (1898–1981), Soviet actor, film director and screenwriter
Shimon Dzigan (1905–1980), Polish Jewish comedian

See also

, Russian rapper 

Jewish surnames